St Saviour's Church, Retford is a Grade II listed parish church in the Church of England in Retford.

History

The church dates from 1829. It was consecrated on 27 September 1829 by the Rt. Revd. Edward Venables-Vernon-Harcourt Archbishop of York as a daughter church of St John the Baptist Church, Clarborough, the church became a parish in its own right in 1871. It was restored in 1878. In 2002 it was united with St Swithun's and St Michael's in Retford to become a joint parish. Following further re-organisation, St. Saviour's became a single parish again in 2019 covering much of the east side of Retford.

Two stained glass memorial windows are by Charles Eamer Kempe

Clergy

Joshua William Brooks 1827 - 1843
Charles Hodge 1844 - 1858
James Disney 1860 - 1876
Lawrence Roworth 1877 - 1913
Edwin Paxton 1914 - 1927
Frederic Eddy 1927 - 1930
Edward Hester 1931 - 1933
Lawrence Ashcroft 1934 - 1943
James Godsmark 1943 - 1955
Thomas Womack 1956 - 1967
John Moore 1967 - 1973
John Tompkins 1973 - 1987
Tony Walker 1988 - 2017
Ben Clayton 2018–Present

See also
Listed buildings in Retford

References

Church of England church buildings in Nottinghamshire
Grade II* listed churches in Nottinghamshire
Saint Saviour